Geethanjali (1947 – 31 October 2019) was an Indian actress who worked in Telugu, Tamil, Malayalam, and Hindi films. In an career spanning close to six decades, she featured in over 500 films across multiple languages. Her first film as a dancer is Rani Ratnaprabha in 1960. NTR introduced her to the silver screen as a heroine with his directorial debut film Sita Rama Kalyanam in 1961. She was famous for her roles in Murali Krishna (1964), Doctor Chakravarthy (1964), Illalu (1965), Sambarala Rambabu (1970), Kaalam Marindi (1972), and Abbayigaru Ammayigaru (1973). She was also a member of the Nandi Awards committee.

Personal life
Geethanjali worked in the Hindi film Parasmani (1963), a Lakshmikant-Pyarelal production. Since her name Mani was already present in the title, the film-maker re-christened her as Geetanjali.

Geethanjali worked with actor Rama Krishna in number of films like Thodu Needa (1965), Hantakulostunnaru Jagratta (1966), Rajayogam (1967), Ranabheri (1968), Nenu Naa Desam (1973) etc. before marrying him on 15 August 1974.

Death
Geethanjali died in the early hours of 31 October 2019 from cardiac arrest. She died while undergoing treatment at a private hospital near Film Nagar in Hyderabad.

Filmography

Telugu

 Rani Ratnaprabha (1960) - debut as a Bharatanatyam dancer
 Seetarama Kalyanam (1961) as Goddess Sita
 Gulebakavali Katha (1962)
 Kalavari Kodallu (1964) as Hamsa
 Dr. Chakravarthy (1964) as Sudha
 Thotalo Pilla Kotalo Rani (1964) as Dancer
 Murali Krishna (1964) as Poornima
 Bobbili Yuddham (1964)
 Babruvahana (1964)
 Illalu (1965) Heroine and double role
 Devata (1965) as Hema
 Thodu Needa (1965) - First movie with future husband, Ramakrishna (Telugu actor)
 Leta Manasulu (1966) as Nirmala
 Potti Pleader (1966) paired with Padmanabham
 Gudachari 116 (1966)
 Hantakulostunnaru Jagratta (1966)
 Poola Rangadu (1967)
 Chadarangam (1967)
 Upayamlo Apayam (1967)
 Rajayogam (1967)
 Adrushtavanthulu (1967)
 Ave Kallu (1967) as Julie
 Sri Sri Sri Maryada Ramanna (1967)
 Prana Mitrulu (1967)
 Ranabheri (1968)
 Adrushtavanthalu (1968) as Radha
 Panthalu Pattimpulu (1968)
 Manchi Mitrulu (1969)
 Nindu Hrudayalu (1969)
 Aadarsa Kutumbam (1969)
 Karpura Harathi (1969)
 Nirdoshi (1970)
 Sambarala Rambabu (1970)
 Jatakaratna Midathambotlu (1971)
 Kalam Marindi (1972)
 Raitu Kutumbam (1972)
 Adrushta Devatha (1972)
 Abbaigaru Ammaigaru (1973) - paired with Telugu Super Star Krishna
 Ajanma Brahmachari (1973)
 Devudamma (1973) as Paidithalli
 Nenu Naa Desam (1973)
 Kannavari kalalu (1974)
 Pacha Thoranam (1994)
 Fools (2003)
 Maayajaalam (2006)
 Pellaina Kothalo (2006) as Hari's Grandmother
 Mogudu (2011) as Grandmother
 Greeku Veerudu (2013)
 Bhai (2013) as Vasu's Grandmother
 Vunnadhi Okate Zindagi (2017)
 That Is Mahalakshmi  (2020)

Tamil
 Sarada (1962)
 Deivathin Deivam (1962)
 Thaayin Madiyil (1964)
 Maayamani (1964)
 Alli (1964)
 Panam Padaithavan (1965)
 Vaazhkai Padagu (1965)
 Veera Abhimanyu (1965)
 Aasai Mugam (1965) as Kamala
 Adhey Kangal (1967)
 Nenjirukkum Varai (1967)
 Anbalippu (1969)
 En Annan (1970)
 Annamitta Kai (1972)
 Ganga Gowri (1973)

Hindi
 Paying Guest (1957) as Shanthi's sister
 Parasmani (1963) as Rajkumari
 Do Kaliyaan (1968) as Menaka
 Balram Shri Krishna (1968) as Rukmini
 Tulsi Vivah (1971)

Malayalam
 Kaattumallika (1966)
 Swapnangal (1970) as Rajamma
 Madhuvidhu'' (1970) as Sathi

References

External links
 

1947 births
2019 deaths
Telugu actresses
Actresses in Telugu cinema
Indian film actresses
Actresses in Hindi cinema
Year of birth unknown
20th-century Indian actresses
Actresses from Rajahmundry
Actresses in Malayalam cinema
Actresses in Tamil cinema
21st-century Indian actresses
Actresses from Andhra Pradesh